Verdigre is the name of a city and a township in Knox County, Nebraska:

 Verdigre, Nebraska
 Verdigre Creek, a stream in Nebraska
 Verdigre Township, Knox County, Nebraska

See also
Verdigris - copper salt, common as a layer on copper that is exposed to the elements